The men's shot put event at the 2013 European Athletics Indoor Championships was held on 28 February 2013 at 19:00 (qualification) and 1 March, 18:45 (final) local time.

Records

Results

Qualification 
Qualification: Qualification Performance 20.15 (Q) or at least 8 best performers advanced to the final.

Final
The final was held at 18:45.

References 

2013 European Athletics Indoor Championships
Shot put at the European Athletics Indoor Championships